The Fongoro, Kole or Gelege are an ethnic group of Sudan and Chad; about 1,000 members of this ethnic group live in the Sila Region of Chad along the Sudanese border. The primary language is Fongoro.

History 
The Fongoro have been pushed into their present location as a consequence of Fur and Arab expansion since the 18th century. The present Fongoro are facing rapid assimilation, where many living in cities and towns populated by Furs are becoming assimilated.

Culture 
The Fongoro engage in hunting and gathering. Some Fongoro also engage in farming, mainly cultivating sorghum.

The Fongoro adhere to Islam.

References 

Ethnic groups in Chad
Ethnic groups in Sudan